{{Infobox individual darts tournament
|tournament_name = 2021 Cazoo Grand Slam of Darts
|dates = 13–21 November 2021
|venue = Aldersley Leisure Village
|location = Aldersley, Wolverhampton
|country = 
|organisation = PDC
|format = Legs
|prize_fund = £550,000
|winners_share = £125,000
|high_checkout =       
|nine_dart = 
|winner =  Gerwyn Price
|prev = 2020
|next = 2022
|image =
}}
The 2021 Cazoo Grand Slam of Darts' was the fifteenth staging of the Grand Slam of Darts, organised by the Professional Darts Corporation. The event returned to the Aldersley Leisure Village, Wolverhampton between 13–21 November 2021, after being held behind closed doors at the Ricoh Arena, Coventry in 2020.

José de Sousa was the defending champion, after defeating James Wade 16–12 in the 2020 final, but he was eliminated in the second round, losing 10–9 to Peter Wright.

Gerwyn Price won the tournament for the third time in four years, defeating Peter Wright 16–8 in the final.

Due to the dissolution of the British Darts Organisation in 2020, there was no BDO/WDF representation for the first time in the event's history.

During her 5–0 victory over Mike De Decker in the group stage, Fallon Sherrock averaged 101.55, setting a new record for the highest televised average by a woman. She then went on to become the first woman to advance to the knockout stage, where she defeated Mensur Suljović in the second round, before losing to Peter Wright in the quarterfinals.

Michael van Gerwen set a new Grand Slam record average of 115.19 during his 5–2 victory over Joe Cullen, surpassing the record set by Dimitri Van den Bergh the previous year.

Prize money
The prize fund for the Grand Slam was the same as 2019 and 2020, with the winner receiving £125,000.

Qualifying
The qualification criteria changed again for the 2021 tournament, as there were no Summer, Autumn or Winter Series events, as well as no Home Tour, and no events organized by the BDO, which dissolved in 2020. The addition of qualifiers from the PDC Challenge and Development Tours replaced BDO representation.

On 11 November, it was announced that Dimitri Van den Bergh had tested positive for COVID-19, ruling him out of the tournament. He was replaced by Chris Dobey, who was next on the list of qualifying criteria.

The qualifiers were:

Qualifying Tournaments

Since the list of qualifiers from the main tournaments produced fewer than the required number of 16 players, the field was to be filled from the reserve lists. The first list consisted of the winners from 2021 European Tour events, with the winners ordered based on Order of Merit position at the cut-off date. However, Gerwyn Price, who had already qualified, won both European Tour events, and thus this list produced no new competitors.

Since there were still fewer than 16 qualifiers after European Tour champions were included, the players with the most 2021 Players Championship titles were added. Order of Merit position served as a tiebreaker.

PDC Qualifying Event
A further eight places in the Grand Slam of Darts were filled by winners of a qualifying event on 5 November.

These are the qualifiers:

Additional qualifiers
The winners of these tournaments and tours also qualified for the tournament, in place of BDO/WDF representation.

Draw
The draw was made on  5 November, with the players split into 4 pools based on their current world ranking.

Pools
One player from each non-seeded pool was drawn into a group with a seeded player. The players are listed with their world ranking at the time of the draw.

Group stageAll group matches are best of nine legs  After three games, the top two in each group qualify for the knock-out stage''

NB: P = Played; W = Won; L = Lost; LF = Legs for; LA = Legs against;  = Plus/minus record, in relation to legs; Pts = Points; Status = Qualified to knockout stage

Group A

13 November

14 November

15 November

Group B

13 November

14 November

15 November

Group C

13 November

14 November

15 November

Group D

13 November

14 November

15 November

Group E

13 November

14 November

16 November

Group F

13 November

14 November

16 November

Group G

13 November

14 November

16 November

Group H

13 November

14 November

16 November

Knockout stage

References

2021
Grand Slam
Grand Slam of Darts
Grand Slam of Darts